Dals Rostock is a locality situated in Mellerud Municipality, Västra Götaland County, Sweden. It had 829 inhabitants in 2010.

References 

Populated places in Västra Götaland County
Populated places in Mellerud Municipality
Dalsland